Ø is a piece of land in the valley of the Nørreå in the eastern part of Jutland, Denmark. Its name means island (ø in the Danish language) and probably comes from the island-like approach to this piece of land, although it is completely landlocked and surrounded by meadows.

Ø is famous among lexicographers for the extreme brevity of its name: the single letter Ø.

See also
List of short place names

Sources

Danish sites
Viborg amt's official site on Nørreå
The Ø hills on fugleognatur.dk
Nørreå valley on skovognatur.dk
Regional geology and topography

Geography of Denmark
Viborg Municipality